Derafsh Kaviani was the legendary royal standard Derafsh (in Latin: vexilloid) of Iran (Persia) used since ancient times until the fall of the Sasanian Empire. The banner was also sometimes called the "Standard of Jamshid" (Drafš-ī Jamshid ), the "Standard of Fereydun" (Drafš-ī Freydun ) and the "Royal Standard" (Drafš-ī Kayi ).

Meaning and origins

The name Drafš-e Kāvīān means "the standard of the kay(s)" (i.e., "kings", kias, kavis ) or "of Kāva." The latter meaning is an identification with an Iranian legend in which the Derafš-e Kāvīān was the standard of a mythological Persian blacksmith-turned-hero named Kaveh (Persian: کاوه), who led a popular uprising against the foreign demon-like ruler Zahhak (Persian: ضحاک). Recalling the legend, the 10th-century epic Shahnameh recasts Zahhak as an evil and tyrannical ruler, against whom Kaveh called the people to arms, using his leather blacksmith apron as a standard, with a spear as its hoist. In the story, after the war that called for the kingship of Fereydun (Persian: فریدون) had been won, the people decorated the apron with jewels and the flag became the symbol of Iranian nationalism and resistance against foreign tyranny.
The symbol of Derafsh Kaviani is a lotus flower, which refers to the royal stars of Persia, and its history goes back to ancient Iranian beliefs from the Achaemenid Empire period.

Sasanian standard
By the late Sasanian era (224–651), a real Drafš e Kāvīān had emerged as the standard of the Sasanian dynasties. It was representative of the Sasanian state—Ērānšāhr (or "Iranian Empire"). Eran Shahr means Aryan Empire in Middle Persian—and may so be considered to have been the first "national flag" of Iran. The banner consisted of a Lotus on a purple field, was encrusted with jewels and had trailing red, gold and purple streamers on its edges. The term achtar was significant since the star also represented "fortune", and the capture and destruction of the banner on a field of battle implied the loss of the battle (and hence the loss of fortune). Following the defeat of the Sasanians at the Battle of al-Qādisiyyah, the Sasanian standard was recovered by one Zerar bin Kattab, who received 30,000 dinars for it. After the jewels were removed, Caliph Umar is said to have burned the standard.

As the symbol of the Sasanian state, the Drafsh e Kavian was irrevocably tied to the concept of Eranshahr and hence with the concept of Iranian nationhood. Thus, in 867, when Ya'qub-i Laith of the Saffarid dynasty claimed the inheritance of the kings of Persia and sought "to revive their glory," a poem written on his behalf sent to the Abbasid caliph said: "With me is the Drafsh e Kavian, through which I hope to rule the nations." Although no evidence that Ya'qub-i Laith ever recreated such a flag, star imagery in banners remained popular until the ascendance of the Lion and Sun symbol (after 1846).

Standard of the President of Tajikistan

The Standard of the President of Tajikistan was introduced in 2006, on the occasion of the inauguration ceremony for the third term of Emomali Rahmon as head of state. It uses the same tricolour, charged with a depiction of the Derafsh Kāviān, the Sasanian royal standard; inside the Derafsh Kāviān is a depiction of a winged lion against a blue sky under a smaller representation of the crown and seven stars.

See also
 Sasanian family tree
 Seven Great Houses of Iran

References and bibliography

External links 

 

Historical flags
National symbols of Iran
Persian words and phrases
Sasanian Empire